Bertel Juslén (August 13, 1880, Ekenäs – June 19, 1951 Kotka) was a sailor from Finland, who represented his country at the 1912 Summer Olympics in Nynäshamn, Sweden in the 8 Metre.

References

Sources
 

1880 births
1951 deaths
People from Raseborg
Sailors at the 1912 Summer Olympics – 8 Metre
Finnish male sailors (sport)
Olympic sailors of Finland
Sportspeople from Uusimaa